The Hartford Distributors shooting was a mass shooting that occurred on August 3, 2010, in Manchester, Connecticut, United States. The location of the crime was a warehouse owned by Hartford Distributors, a beer distribution company. The gunman, former employee Omar Sheriff Thornton (born April 25, 1976) shot and killed eight male coworkers before turning a gun on himself.

Shooting 
Thornton, aged 34, was called into his place of employment for disciplinary purposes. Thornton had been recorded on surveillance video in the Hartford Distributors warehouse stealing beer on a previous occasion. He was also implicated in the theft of empty beer kegs. Hartford Distributors is a wholesale distributor of Budweiser beer products and wine. Given the options of being fired or resigning, Thornton signed the resignation papers and was being escorted out of the building. Instead of leaving, he took a Ruger SR9 semi-automatic pistol from his lunchbox and opened fire.

At the time Thornton started shooting, there were around 40 employees in the building. In just a few minutes, Thornton murdered eight coworkers and seriously injured two others. Many employees made calls to 911, with some callers identifying Thornton. Police arrived on the scene just three minutes after the first 911 call. Police entered the building ten minutes after the first 911 call.  Thornton promptly hid in a locked office. As more police entered the building, Thornton called his mother and explained to her what he had done.  He told her he planned on turning the gun on himself. As police closed in, Thornton called 911, saying his motive for the massacre was racism he had experienced in the workplace. He told the 911 operator that he wished he had killed more people. Soon after hanging up, he killed himself with a shot to the head.

Victims 
Eight people were killed and two others were injured in the shooting.

Killed 
Francis Fazio, Jr., 57
Douglas Scruton, 56
Edwin Kennison, 49
William Ackerman, 51
Bryan Cirigliano, 51
Craig Pepin, 60
Louis Felder,  50
Victor James, 61

Wounded 
Steven Hollander, 50
Jerome Rosenstein, 77

Aftermath 
Family members of Thornton have stated that he had complained to them that, as a Black person, he was being racially discriminated against at his job.  Thornton's girlfriend, Kristi Hannah, claimed that he had seen a picture of a noose and a racial epithet written on a bathroom wall. Thornton was Black in a facility that had mostly white employees, and all of the victims were white. Company and union officials as well as workers at the facility have denied the charges of racism. The union notes that he never filed a complaint with the union or any government agency. Forensic psychiatrist Keith Ablow stated, "I've evaluated plenty of murderers during my career... and I can tell you that people don't commit atrocities because of name-calling." A police probe did not find proof of racism at Hartford Distributors, with other minority workers at Hartford Distributors interviewed by the police disagreeing with Thornton's allegation that the company was "a racist place".

The massacre is the deadliest workplace shooting in Connecticut history and the second-deadliest mass shooting in the state, after the Sandy Hook Elementary School shooting. Connecticut suffered a similar workplace shooting at the Lottery Headquarters in Newington on March 6, 1998, which left five dead including the shooter.

Christy Quail and Sean Quail were arrested for receiving the property alleged to have been stolen by Thornton. Sean Quail was arrested on August 17 in an incident where he sprayed bug-repellent at reporters covering the case. Quail was charged with three counts of first-degree reckless endangerment, three counts of third-degree assault, carrying a dangerous instrument, and breach of peace.

References 

2010 active shooter incidents in the United States
2010 murders in the United States
Mass murder in 2010
Murder–suicides in Connecticut
2010 mass shootings in the United States
Mass shootings in the United States
Manchester, Connecticut
Deaths by firearm in Connecticut
Massacres in the United States
Murder in Connecticut
Workplace violence in the United States
2010 in Connecticut
Crimes in Connecticut
Attacks in the United States in 2010
August 2010 crimes in the United States
Mass shootings in Connecticut
Events in Hartford County, Connecticut